Anna Maria Jansdotter Engsten (1764 – 1804) was awarded with a medal in silver  for Valour in Battle at Sea by King Gustav III of Sweden for her acts during the Russo-Swedish war of 1788–1790. 

Engsten was a maid to the master mariner of the Swedish fleet, G.A. Leijonancker. During the retreat from Viborg and Björkösund, she was evacuated with five sailors in a boat filled with food supplies and the captain's belongings. They were shot at by the Russian fleet, which killed a sheep and caused a leak. The sailors abandoned the boat, but she stayed behind, determined to steer the boat to safety. She did so singlehandedly, although the boat required at least two people to steer, a mission she succeeded with. This was confirmed by Major Scharff. When the King was told about this, he awarded her a medal in silver for Bravery in Battle at Sea as well as a sum of 50 riksdaler. This was paid out on 15 March 1791.

See also 
 Dorothea Maria Lösch

References 

 Cristopher von Warnstedt, Medaljerna för Tapperhet until Sjöss (1974) Forum navale. 29. (The medals of Valour at Sea) (Swedish)
 Wilhelmina Stålberg (1866). Engsten, Anna Maria. Anteckningar om svenska qvinnor. (Notes on Swedish women) (Swedish)

1764 births
Women in 18th-century warfare
18th-century Swedish people
1804 deaths
Women in war in Sweden
People of the Russo-Swedish War (1788–1790)
Gustavian era people
18th-century Swedish women